Carol Reed (1925 or 1926 – June 4, 1970), always introduced as "Carol Reed, the weather girl", presented the weather portion of the evening newscasts on WCBS-TV in New York City from 1952 to 1964. Not trained in meteorology, she nevertheless proved popular with viewers because of her cheerful demeanor and her characteristic signoff, "Good night and have a happy!"
In 1958, she gained national recognition, as the commercial spokesperson for Nabisco.

After her run on channel 2 ended, she hosted a radio show on WCBS (AM) prior to its changeover to its current all-news format.

She died of cancer on June 4, 1970, in Mamaroneck, New York at age 44.

References

 Obituary in The New York Times, June 5, 1970.  Retrieved on January 16, 2008.
Grolier Encyclopedia Year Book - 1970 (Deaths section), published 1971

External links

1970 deaths
American television personalities
American women television personalities
Weather presenters
Deaths from cancer in New York (state)
Year of birth uncertain